The Wind is an album by Iranian Musician, Kayhan Kalhor, and Turkish folk Musician Erdal Erzincan that was released by ECM Records in 2006. It was their first collaborative album and The result is a set of instrumental compositions that flow into each other like one continuous work.
Kalhor recorded The Wind in Istanbul at November 2004 and mixed it, together with ECM producer Manfred Eicher at Oslo's Rainbow Studio in 2006.

Robin Denselow at The Guardian described the album as a "thoughtful, intriguing work".

Track list
All music By Kayhan Kalhor and Erdal Erzincan.
"Part I" - 5:45 
"Part II" - 4:12 
"Part III" - 4:39
"Part IV" - 3:42 
"Part V" - 7:27 
"Part VI" - 4:41 
"Part VII" - 2:44 
"Part VIII" - 3:58
"Part IX" - 5:58 
"Part X" - 4:48
"Part XI" - 8:19 
"Part XII" - 7:23

Personnel
Kayhan Kalhor - Kamancheh
Erdal Erzincan - Baglama
Ulaş Özdemir - Divan baglama

References

Kayhan Kalhor albums
2006 albums
ECM Records albums
Collaborative albums
2006 classical albums